Gillian Guess (born 1955) is a Vancouver woman who was convicted in 1998 of obstruction of justice after becoming romantically involved with a murder defendant while she was a juror in his 1995 trial.

Her case became significant because it set legal precedents in four areas of Canadian Law: it was the first case where a juror had sexual relations with a murder defendant during his trial; the only case where a juror has faced criminal sanction for the decision they have made; the only case in Canadian law where jury room discussions were made part of the public record. Regarding the sanctity of juror deliberations up until Guess was arrested, there was no law in Canada that made her actions illegal and moreover, the procedures used in her trial may have violated Guess' rights under the Canadian Charter. A portion of Guess' trial was closed to both her and the press and Guess' attorney was not allowed to discuss this portion of the trial with her.

The Secret Trial 
Shortly after the acquittal in the Regina v. Johal trial, Gillian Guess was investigated by Canadian authorities so as to determine whether she had obstructed justice during her tenure as juror in the aforementioned trial. Various surveillance devices -  from wiretaps of Ms. Guess and her circle of acquaintances to an electronic bug placed in Ms. Guess' bedroom - were employed in furtherance of this investigation. The resulting evidence obtained was voluminous, and various hearings were held during which the legality of the surveillance evidence was contested. These hearings were conducted in secret and are sealed.  Guess' defense counsel could not, by order of the court, disclose the content of these hearings to any party not present at the hearings. Guess herself was not allowed at the hearings and her counsel could not relate to her what transpired at the hearings.  The secret hearing, wherein the court enjoins all those present from disclosing the contents of the hearing and simultaneously refuses to offer the defendant admittance to the hearing, was unprecedented in Canadian law.  Guess was never given an explanation as to why the hearings were conducted in secret.

Analysis by Harvard Law School
The secret proceedings presented a plethora of problems, but two issues manifested themselves with a common strain of argument.

Effectiveness of Counsel 
The court's order that Ms. Guess' attorney could not share with her the contents of the hearings impairs the ability of Ms. Guess to consult effectively with and instruct her attorney. Since it is not known exactly what transpired at the hearings, it is difficult to comment specifically on effects this had on her trial, but it does not seem unreasonable to argue that the gagging of one's attorney concerning certain issues of fact and law and the corresponding destruction of an optimal (or even satisfactory) attorney-client interaction vitiates one's right to a fair trial and deprives one of liberty without due process of law.

The court's failure to explain officially its depart from precedent seems ill-advised. While it is difficult to see why Ms. Guess should not have 
been privy to the secret hearings and then bound by court order to disclose nothing, that is not to say definitively there could have been no countervailing state concern of sufficient magnitude to overcome Ms. Guess' interest in a fair trial.  Perhaps there is some concern or group of concerns that might demand secret hearings, but the court certainly owes Ms. Guess, the public, and future jurists an explanation as to what—in conceptual if not specific terms—those concerns are and what will qualify for the same secret treatment in the future. With secret trials being antithetical to the notion of a free and open society, it seems reasonable that their use should at least demand an explanation.  In an interesting twist, the court may have injured itself, as the lack of any explanation for its decision has undermined the court's credibility with numerous observers who have suggested that improper pressure on the court from certain powerful figures in the Canadian government, as opposed to any compelling legal justification, was the real reason for holding the hearings in secret.

Police allegations
According to the Vancouver Police Department, Peter Gill (also known as Preet Sarbjit Gill) and his brother-in-law ran a gang involved in the drug trade in Vancouver.  Police believed that in February 1994, the gang lured Jimsher Dosanjh (aged 26) to an alley, where they murdered him with machine guns. Two months later, the gang allegedly also murdered Dosanjh's brother Ranjit.

Relationship between Guess and Gill
In the case of Regina v. Gill, Peter Gill was charged with two counts of first-degree murder. Five of his associates, Bhupinder (Bindy) Johal, Rajinder Kumar Benji, Michael Kent Budai, Ho Sik (Phil) Kim, and Sun News Lal were tried with him on the murder charges. The trial began on February 27, 1995 and lasted eight months. It was one of the longest, most expensive and most complicated trials in British Columbia history.  Gillian Guess was selected to serve as a juror for the murder trial. During the trial, Guess and Gill started a relationship that became sexual.

Guess was quickly attracted to Gill, a man eight years her junior. According to court clerk Emma Hyde, Guess would stare at Gill and "She would flip her hair and look seductive".  Later Gill approached Guess at McDonald's and told her he was innocent of the charges.  Sometime later, the two started to flirt outside the courtroom. Gill pursued the relationship, and Gill and Guess had an intimate conversation and kissed in Stanley Park.  The relationship became sexual.  Guess said, "My attraction to him was a complete intoxication... I got to the point where I couldn't see straight. It just became an obsession."

Court officers informed the judge of the inappropriate behaviour, and the Honourable Judge Braidwood warned Gill about his behaviour, but he never spoke to Guess.
The relationship continued, and when Guess asked Gill if she should find a way to get off the jury, he told her to stay.  He also told her to convict two of his co-defendants, but not him.

In May 2001, Peter Gill and his associates Budai and Kim were ordered to be retried by the British Columbia Court of Appeal on the first degree murder charges. However, the Crown never retried them. Instead, Peter Gill was convicted for obstruction of justice. He received a sentence of six years in prison.

Regina v. Guess 
Several months after the acquittal of Peter Gill, Vancouver Police saw Guess and Gill dancing together at a night club.  Police investigated, and placed secret surveillance devices in Guess' bedroom, and tapped her phone. They recorded her admitting to others, including her daughter, that she had been involved in a romantic relationship with Gill while she was a juror at his trial.

In 1998, Crown prosecutor Joseph Bellows laid an obstruction of justice charge against Gillian Guess, arguing she had violated s. 139 (2) of the Canadian Criminal Code .  Guess pleaded not guilty.  Guess seemed to enjoy all the media attention she received during the trial, and she seemed determined to prove that she had done nothing illegal.  She said, "After eight months even the trial judge started looking good."

Guess was convicted of obstruction of justice.  After being convicted she said, "I have been convicted for falling in love and nothing more. I have not committed a crime." She was sentenced to 18 months in prison and was released after serving 3 months in a minimum security women's facility known as "Camp Cupcake."  She appealed her sentence, but the appeal was dismissed on November 2, 2000.

Media coverage
The trial of Gillian Guess became a media sensation, with reporters coming from as far away as Germany and New Zealand to cover it.  The Gillian Guess story was also told on the news magazine show Inside Edition, and on the ABC News Show 20/20. Gillian Guess was also photographed for Marie Claire magazine. In 1998, Gillian Guess wrote an article in a Simon Fraser University campus newspaper named "The Peak."

Her story was the subject of a 2004 movie, The Love Crimes of Gillian Guess, and was the basis of the Law & Order episode "Hubris".

References

People from Vancouver
1955 births
Living people
People convicted of obstruction of justice